Infectious Agents and Cancer is a peer-reviewed open access medical journal covering the relationship between infections and cancer. It was established in 2006 and is published by BioMed Central. It is affiliated with the African Organization for Research and Training in Cancer. The editors-in-chief are Franco M. Buonaguro (Istituto Nazionale Tumori), Sam M. Mbulaiteye (National Cancer Institute) and Maria Lina Tornesello (Istituto Nazionale Tumori). According to the Journal Citation Reports, the journal has a 2021 impact factor of 3.698.

References

External links

Oncology journals
Microbiology journals
BioMed Central academic journals
Online-only journals
Publications established in 2006
English-language journals